H. bidentata may refer to:

 Heterocrita bidentata, a geometer moth
 Hexisea bidentata, an orchid of the Americas
 Hovanuncia bidentata, a harvestman first described in 1959